Cool Well is a historic home located near Mechanicsville, Hanover County, Virginia. It was built in 1834–1835, and is a small, -story, frame Tidewater cottage in the Federal style. The house sits on a brick foundation and has a gable roof with dormers.

It was listed on the National Register of Historic Places in 2007.

References

Houses on the National Register of Historic Places in Virginia
Federal architecture in Virginia
Houses completed in 1835
Houses in Hanover County, Virginia
National Register of Historic Places in Hanover County, Virginia